Kirkmichael may refer to:

Kirkmichael, Dumfries and Galloway, Scotland, see List of listed buildings in Kirkmichael, Dumfries and Galloway
Kirkmichael, Moray, Scotland
Kirkmichael, Perth and Kinross, Scotland
Kirkmichael, South Ayrshire, Scotland
Kirk Michael, Isle of Man